Victoria Garance Alixe Legrand (born May 28, 1981) is a French-American musician, best known as the lead vocalist, songwriter and keyboardist of the dream pop duo Beach House.

Early life
Legrand was born in Paris, France, the daughter of painter Olivier Legrand (fr) and niece of the French composer Michel Legrand and vocalist Christiane Legrand of The Swingle Singers. She spent her early years in Paris until age six, when her family moved to the United States, first briefly living in Baltimore, Maryland, before relocating to rural Cecil County. The family subsequently moved to Philadelphia, Pennsylvania, where Legrand spent her adolescent and teenage years. She is fluent in both French and English. 

Legrand studied piano throughout her early life and adolescence, and, as a teenager, performed in a Led Zeppelin cover band. She graduated from the Shipley School in Bryn Mawr, Pennsylvania in 1999, and subsequently attended Vassar College, where she majored in drama. After graduating in 2003, she relocated to Paris to study acting at the International Theatre School of Jacques Lecoq. After becoming "disenchanted with theater school" and more interested in songwriting and in musical artists such as Le Tigre and Yo La Tengo, she dropped out of the program and returned to the United States, settling in Baltimore.

Career

In 2004, Legrand met Baltimore native Alex Scally, and they quickly formed a two-piece band. Legrand often mentions how organically they work together, and how, in Scally, she found her "musical soulmate." The two have recorded eight studio albums as Beach House: Beach House (2006), Devotion (2008), Teen Dream (2010), Bloom (2012), Depression Cherry (2015), Thank Your Lucky Stars (2015), 7 (2018), and Once Twice Melody (2022).

Musicianship

Vocal style
Legrand possesses a contralto vocal range. Some music outlets have compared her vocals to those of Nico and Mazzy Star's Hope Sandoval.

Songwriting and influences
Legrand and Scally write music anywhere between eight and 16 hours a day, and strive to create thoughtful music they feel strongly about. Legrand often emphasizes the honesty, thoughtfulness, and authenticity Beach House tries to get across in their music. Legrand laments the references to Beach House as being "wafty, wavy, floaty, dreamy," and insists on the band's loudness and all-encompassing soundscapes they create: "We are a loud band. OK, so it's not abrasive, but it's not soft."

Legrand has said in interviews that she wishes audiences would focus on the craft of their songwriting; She commented, "what you're feeling is the craft, that everything is there with intention," as opposed to the individual sounds that surround "the real meat of it all....There's a lot of great sounds in music, but it's not gonna necessarily make you feel something." She is protective of the identity of the band and cautiously chooses how they expose themselves to their audience.

She has remarked on her love of The Cure, the Cocteau Twins, Gene Clark, and cited Courtney Love as an influence.

Discography

Guest appearances

References

External links

 

Living people
1981 births
American contraltos
Musicians from Baltimore
Musicians from Philadelphia
Vassar College alumni
Writers from Baltimore
American women in electronic music
French emigrants to the United States
Singers from Maryland
21st-century American women singers
21st-century American singers
Shipley School alumni